Tiril Sjåstad Christiansen (born 7 April 1995) is a Norwegian freestyle skier. She hails from Geilo and represents Geilo IL. She won her first Winter X Games medal in the Women's Slopestyle at the Winter X Games XVII in Aspen, Colorado. She won gold ahead of Kaya Turski and Dara Howell. Months later she continued to dominate on the podium and won her second Winter X Games medal, but this time it was a silver.

References

External links
 
 
 
 

1995 births
Living people
People from Hol
Norwegian female freestyle skiers
Freestyle skiers at the 2018 Winter Olympics
Olympic freestyle skiers of Norway
Freestyle skiers at the 2012 Winter Youth Olympics
Sportspeople from Viken (county)
21st-century Norwegian women